Seville-Santa Justa railway station is the major railway station of the Spanish city of Seville, Andalusia. It was opened in 1991 with the inauguration of the Madrid–Seville high-speed rail line, and serves around 9.25 million passengers a year.

History
Seville's first main railway station was called , which was situated on the banks of the Guadalquivir river as a terminus station for trains heading north of the city. A southern terminus known as the Cádiz station served southbound trains. As part of the preparations for the arrival of the Seville Expo '92, the rail tracks on the river bank were removed and the area redeveloped. The Madrid–Seville high-speed rail line was opened in 1992 with the new Santa Justa railway station connected via a tunnel to the underground San Bernardo railway station, allowing through services north to south.

Services

Santa Justa is the hub of the Cercanías Sevilla commuter rail network, and is served by AVE high-speed trains to Madrid and Barcelona via Córdoba, and southward AVE services to Málaga María Zambrano and Granada via Antequera-Santa Ana.  Alvia trains operate from Madrid to Cádiz via Santa Justa, as well as Larga and Media Distancia services to Algeciras, Almería, Huelva and Jaén. It is also served by six TUSSAM bus routes.

Projects
The MetroCentro tram line is projected to be extended to serve Santa Justa station. The proposed Line 2 of the Seville Metro will also serve the station if built.

References

1991 establishments in Spain
Buildings and structures in Seville
Rail transport in Seville
Railway stations in Andalusia
Railway stations in Spain opened in 1991